Khasi II (Chechen: Эла Хаси II "Prince Khasi II") was a Chechen ruler and the king of the Durdzuks and Alans, although his reign was not recognized by the highlanders. He belonged to the Sado-Orsoy dynasty of Chechnya and was the successor of Chakh.

Family and descendants 
Khasi I
Khour I
Chakh
Khasi II
Khour II
Makhama
Surakat
Bayr
Sarka

Reign 
Between the years 1318–1319, 40 years after the last major confrontation between the North Caucasians and the Mongol Empire, Khasi launched a failed uprising against the Mongol Empire, which may have been the reason as to why Özbeg Khan set up his headquarters on the Sunzha River. Although his reign was not recognized by the Alans and Durdzuks, the uprising was supported by the highlanders.
Khasi, unlike his ancestors, was a Muslim.

However, according to other versions, Khasi, because of his religion, corporated with the Golden Horde and ran a pro-Mongol administration of the region.

Successor 
Khasi II would be succeeded by his son Khour II, who would launch another rebellion against the Golden Horde, ending in a success and allowing the Vainakhh to establish an independent state: The Princedom of Simsim.

See also 
Khasi I
Khour I
Chakhig
Mongol invasions of Durdzuketi
Siege of Maghas
Botur

References

Literature 

 
 
 
 
 
 

History of Chechnya
History of Ingushetia
Chechen people
Chechen politicians
Lists of 13th-century people
Lists of 14th-century people
Nakh peoples
13th-century rulers
14th-century rulers
History of the North Caucasus